Ntjam Rosie, born as Rosie Boei (March 18, 1983, in Sonkoe, Cameroon), is a Dutch-Cameroonian singer/songwriter from Rotterdam, The Netherlands. Her style is a mix of pop music, jazz and soul. She moved to the Netherlands at the age of nine where she grew up in Maastricht.

Career 

Ntjam Rosie (then working under the name Ntjamrosie) released her debut album Atouba through Apple Tree Records on January 20, 2008. It was produced by Nelson & Djosa. The sound of the album is best described as Future Afro Soul. Patience was released as a single.

She graduated from the Codarts Conservatory Rotterdam as a bachelor of music. She majored in Latin singing and minored in teaching.
 
Her second album Elle came out in 2010, again produced by Nelson & Djosa, released independently. It was nominated for an Edison Jazzism Public Award in 2011. For Elle, Ntjam Rosie found inspiration in artists like George Duke, Stevie Wonder, Patrice Rushen, Syreeta and Miriam Makeba.
 
For the production she again teamed up with Nelson & Djosa. Among the musicians were on drums U.K. based Nathan Allen (Amy Winehouse, Faith Evans), also U.K. based on bass Alex Bonfanti (Tom Jones, Xantone Blacq), Ronald Snijders (flute), Tuur Moens (drums) and Alexander van Popta (keys). The recording took place at the Flowriders Music studio in Amsterdam.

In 2012, Ntjam Rosie released Live at Grounds, a CD/DVD with live recordings of her performance at the GROUNDS venue in Rotterdam. Her third album, At The Back Of Beyond, came out March 15, 2013, produced by jazz pianist, composer and producer Alexander van Popta. The album title is inspired by the movie Black Narcissus and the guitar plays a much bigger role than on her previous album ‘Elle’. ‘At The Back Of Beyond’ was released on Ntjam Rosie’s own record label Gentle Daze Records.

Ntjam Rosie has been heard and seen in various Dutch media programs such as Giel Beelen 3FM radio show, De Wereld Draait Door, Vrije Geluiden and BNN. She was support act for artists like Erykah Badu, José James, Macy Gray and Bilal. She played in prestigious clubs like Paradiso, Melkweg, Rotown and Sugar Factory and performed on various festivals such as Dunya, Mundial and Jazz in Duketown. In 2011 she performed at the world-renowned North Sea Jazz Festival.

International 

Ntjam Rosie has opened for Jesse Boykins III in the London Jazz Cafe. Elle was released in Germany, Switzerland, Austria and Japan. On August 29, 2013 she also released her third album At The Back Of Beyond in the United Kingdom. Internationally she toured in Turkey, Switzerland, Germany, Estonia, Lithuania, United Kingdom, South Korea, China and Thailand.

Discography 

 2008: Atouba (as Ntjam Rosie)
 Single: Patience (vinyl)
 2010: Elle
 2012: Live at Grounds
 2013: At The Back Of Beyond
 2015: The One
 2017: Breaking Cycles (as Ntjam Rosie)
 2020: Family and Friends
 2021: Home Cooking

Awards and nominations

Ntjam Rosie won the Music Matters Award in 2009, gaining her the title of music ambassador in Rotterdam during 2010. On the same day she also won the ‘MCN World Up! Award’ for most promising talent during the first edition of the Dutch World Music Day. In 2011, Ntjam Rosie´s Elle was nominated for the Dutch Edison Jazzism Public Music Awards. In 2013 its successor At the back of Beyond was again nominated for this prestigious award. She was also nominated for the Elle Personal Style Awards in 2013.

References

 Website Ntjam Rosie 

1983 births
Dutch people of Cameroonian descent
Musicians from Rotterdam
Dutch singer-songwriters
Living people
21st-century Dutch singers